The Hon. Charles William Wentworth-FitzWilliam (18 September 1826 – 20 December 1894) was a Liberal Party politician and first-class cricketer in the United Kingdom.

Wentworth-FitzWilliam was a younger son of Charles Wentworth-FitzWilliam, 5th Earl FitzWilliam, and the Hon. Mary, daughter of Thomas Dundas, 1st Baron Dundas. William Wentworth-FitzWilliam, 6th Earl FitzWilliam and George Wentworth-FitzWilliam were his elder brothers.

Wentworth-FitzWilliam played first-class cricket for the Marylebone Cricket Club against Cambridge University at Lord's in 1849. Batting twice in the match, he was dismissed by Edward Blore and Alfred Potter for scores of 10 and 4 respectively. He was elected Member of Parliament for Malton in 1852, a seat he held until the constituency was abolished in 1885.
 
Wentworth-FitzWilliam married his first cousin Anne, daughter of Reverend Thomas Lawrence Dundas, in 1854. He died in December 1894, aged 68. His wife died in December 1925.

References

1826 births
1894 deaths
Younger sons of earls
Liberal Party (UK) MPs for English constituencies
Whig (British political party) MPs for English constituencies
UK MPs 1852–1857
UK MPs 1857–1859
UK MPs 1859–1865
UK MPs 1865–1868
UK MPs 1868–1874
UK MPs 1874–1880
UK MPs 1880–1885
English cricketers
Marylebone Cricket Club cricketers